The 42-centimetre  14 L/12 (short naval cannon), or Minenwerfer-Gerät (M-Gerät), popularly known by the nickname Big Bertha, was a German siege howitzer built by Krupp AG in Essen, Germany and fielded by the Imperial German Army from 1914 to 1918. The  had a  calibre barrel, making it one of the largest artillery pieces ever fielded.

The  designed in 1911 as an iteration of earlier super-heavy German siege guns intended to break modern fortresses in France and Belgium and entered production in 1912. Test firing began in early 1914 and the gun was estimated to be finished by October 1914. When the First World War broke out, the two  guns, still prototypes, were sent to Liège, Belgium, and destroyed Forts Pontisse and Loncin. German soldiers bestowed the gun with the nickname "Big Bertha", which then spread through German newspapers to the Allies, who used it as a nickname for all super-heavy German artillery. The Paris Gun, a railway gun used to bomb Paris in 1918, has historically been confused for the M-Gerät.

It had a longer and heavier barrel that was mated to the 's carriage but was found to be less effective than the base gun.

Development and design
The quick advancement of artillery technology beginning in the 1850s provoked an arms race between artillery and military architecture. Rifled artillery could now fire out of range of fortress guns, so military architects began placing forts in rings around cities or in barriers to block approaching armies. These forts were vulnerable to new artillery shells, which could penetrate earth to destroy masonry underground. In response, star forts evolved into polygonal forts, mostly underground and made of concrete with guns mounted in armoured, rotating casemates. Combining rings and barriers, France created a vast fortified zone on its border with Germany, while Belgium began construction of the National Redoubt in 1888.

The German Empire also fortified its borders, but Chief of the General Staff Helmuth von Moltke the Elder desired the ability to break through Franco-Belgian fortifications. Although German artillery had been effective during the Franco-Prussian War, it had been allowed to stagnate. By the 1880s the barrel diameter of the German Army's most powerful gun, the  field howitzer, was no longer adequate against fortresses. Moltke began requesting more powerful guns that same decade. More powerful artillery became essential to his successor, Alfred von Schlieffen, who planned quickly to defeat France by sweeping through Belgium (the Schlieffen Plan) in response to the 1893 Franco-Russian Alliance. Tests in the mid-1890s showed that the  could not destroy French or Belgian forts, even with improved shells. Interest in a more powerful siege gun waned until the Russo-Japanese War, during which the Japanese Army used 28 cm howitzer L/10 ( coastal guns) brought from Japan to end the 11-month long Siege of Port Arthur.

Design and testing for the  began in 1906 and lasted until 1911. Although the  had the destructive power the General Staff required and could outrange French and Belgian fort guns, it could only be emplaced near rail lines and took 24 hours to prepare. As early as 1907, Krupp began development of siege artillery transported by gun carriage. Testing resulted in a  howitzer transportable over road and countryside but it was rejected by the APK, as was Krupp's 30.5-centimetre model. The APK ordered its first  in July 1912 and another in February 1913. Tests of the gun's mobility began in December 1913 and found that gas-powered tractors were best for pulling it. Test firing, at one point observed by Kaiser Wilhelm II, began in February 1914, and Krupp estimated that the  would be complete by October 1914.

Design and production
The gun was breech loaded, using a horizontally-sliding breech block and had a  barrel that could be elevated to a maximum of 65°. Post-prototype  guns had a crew platform in front of the blast shield, a detachable breech, and solid wheels. The APK ordered the first  in July 1912, delivered the following December, and a second in February 1913. Another two guns were ordered before the First World War on 31 July 1914, and then two more on 28 August and another pair on 11 November. Krupp eventually built 12  howitzers.

The  had to be assembled for firing and for transport was dismantled and towed in five wagons. These wagons, weighing  each, were designed to hold a specific portion of the M-Gerät, sans the gun carriage, which was its own wagon. These were towed by purpose-built, gas-powered tractors as the wagons were too heavy to be pulled by horses. To move across open country, the wagon wheels were fitted with articulated feet called  to reduce their ground pressure.

The 30.5-centimetre , called the  L/30, was developed in late 1917 to replace  guns that had been rendered inoperable by premature detonation of shells. Two large spring cylinders were added to the front of the gun to counterbalance the new barrel, which had to be carried in a new carriage weighing . Only four Beta-M-Gerät guns were modified from two M-Gerät guns and two  guns (a one- to two-month-long process per gun), but 12 L/30 barrels were built.

Ammunition

German siege artillery had three types of projectiles: armour-piercing, high-explosive and intermediate. The armour-piercing shell was designed to smash through concrete and metal armour but was largely ineffective against reinforced concrete. High-explosive shells were fitted with two charges and could be set to have no delay, a short delay or a long delay. If set to "no delay" the shell burst on impact. Finally, the intermediate, or "short shell", weighed half as much as the high-explosive shell and was fitted with a ballistic tip for range and accuracy. Siege artillery shells were produced in limited runs of varying quality. Beginning in early 1916, German siege guns began to suffer internal explosions due to faulty ammunition. Crews were required to disembark from the gun before firing via a lanyard.

Service history 
The  (KMK) batteries that formed with M-Gerät guns were 3 (2 August 1914), 5 (June 1915), 6 (Summer 1915) and 7 (early 1916). Battery 3 was split in half in April 1916 to form 10 with a single M-Gerät each. The four Beta-M-Gerät guns produced were fielded by KMK Batteries 8 and 10 after their M-Gerät gun barrels had been destroyed by premature detonation.

Western Front

By June 1914, the prototype M-Gerät howitzers had returned to Essen for final adjustments and would have been formed into a reserve artillery battery on completion in October. On 2 August 1914, they were organised into KMK Battery 3 and sent to the Western Front with 240 men. On 4 August, the 1st Army arrived near Liège, Belgium, the first objective of the Schlieffen Plan and began the Battle of Liège. Although German troops entered the city on 7 August, its forts were firing upon the road to be taken by the 2nd Army and had to be reduced. Heavy artillery began their attack on 8 August. KMK Battery 3 was the first siege battery sent into battle to bombard the Fort de Pontisse on 12 August, which surrendered after two days. The battery next moved to the Fort de Liers but the fort surrendered as the battery was being emplaced. KMK Battery 3 relocated to the Fort de Loncin, where Gérard Leman directed the defence of Liège. Firing commenced on 15 August and lasted two hours, as the 25th shot fired struck a magazine and caused an explosion that destroyed the fort. The Germans carried Leman, unconscious, out of Loncin, and the last two forts, Hollogne and Flémalle, capitulated on 16 August.

With Liège captured, the 1st Army continued north-west while the 2nd and 3rd Armies marched to Namur, whose forts were undermanned, unmaintained, and poorly stocked with ammunition. The 2nd Army arrived on 20 August 1914 to open the Siege of Namur, but began their main attacks the following day with 400 pieces of artillery. KMK Battery 3 fired upon the Fort de Marchovelette, which was destroyed on 23 August by a magazine explosion. The battery shifted its fire to the Fort de Maizeret, already under bombardment by four Austro-Hungarian Skoda 30.5-centimetre guns, and compelled its surrender. With the eastern forts occupied, the Germans entered Namur and the remaining Belgian forces evacuated from the city.

Following the defeat of the Western Allies at Charleroi and at Mons, the British Expeditionary Force withdrew past Maubeuge, their base of operations after arriving in France. On 24 August 1914, the advancing Germans arrived at the fortresses of Maubeuge and began the  Siege of Maubeuge and its garrison of 45,000 soldiers. The next day, the VII Reserve Corps were left behind the main German armies to take the city. Bombardment of the forts began on 30 August, with KMK Battery 3 tasked with reducing  (Fort Sarts) but it mistakenly shelled an interval fortification in front of Sarts. By 5 September, a hole in the fortress ring had been opened by German 21-centimetre guns, but they had by now exhausted their ammunition. To widen that gap, the siege guns then expended their remaining ammunition against Forts Leveau, Héronfontaine, and Cerfontaine on 7 September, and destroyed them in quick succession. The two remaining French forts surrendered that same day and the Germans occupied Maubeuge on 8 September.

With Maubeuge taken, German siege guns were available for an attack on Paris, but Germany's defeat at the Battle of the Marne blocked the advance of the 1st and 2nd Armies, and the guns were instead sent to Antwerp. King Albert I had ordered a general retreat to Antwerp on 18 August, and his army arrived in the city two days later. From Antwerp, Albert made attacks on the German flank on 24–25 August and 9 September, prompting General Alexander von Kluck of the 1st Army to send the III Reserve Corps to seize Antwerp. It arrived and partially surrounded Antwerp from the south-west on September 27, and bombardment began the next day. From 7 to 9 October, the Belgian army fled from Antwerp and the city surrendered on 10 October.

Early in 1916, all 42-centimetre guns were assigned to the 5th Army, which amassed a total of 24 siege guns, the highest concentration of them during the war. The Battle of Verdun was opened on 21 February 1916 with an intense, nine-hour long artillery bombardment. The 42-centimetre guns had to suppress the artillery of Forts Vaux, Douaumont, Souville and  but were unable to penetrate the concrete of the modern fortresses. On the second day of the battle, both of KMK Battery 7's M-Gerät guns were destroyed by premature detonations and KMK Batteries 5 and 6 both lost an M-Gerät each to the same cause. Most of the siege guns at Verdun were moved north in July to participate in the Battle of the Somme, and by September the only M-Gerät units left in Verdun were KMK Batteries 3 and 6.

In the final two years of the war, KMK batteries that suffered losses of their big guns had them replaced with smaller–calibre weapons. Those that remained primarily shelled field works and often had low survivability due to malfunctions or Allied counter-battery artillery. KMK Battery 10 lost one M-Gerät to a premature detonation and the other to British warships near Ostend in August 1917 and was rearmed with captured Russian  howitzers. It and KMK Battery 10 were given the four Beta-M-Geräts made during the war in early 1918. For the German spring offensive, KMK Battery 8 was assigned to the 6th Army, Battery 6 to the 2nd Army, and Battery 3 to the 18th Army. The effect of the siege guns was negligible. For Germany's final offensive in July 1918, KMK Batteries 5 and 6 were reassigned to the 7th Army at the Marne, while Batteries 3, 8 and 10 went to the 1st Army at Reims. The batteries again had little to no effect, and Battery 10 became the last German siege battery to fire on a fort, the Fort de la Pompelle. In November 1918, KMK Battery 5 surrendered its guns, the remaining two M-Gerät howitzers, to the American Expeditionary Force.

Eastern Front

On 2 May 1915, August von Mackensen launched the Gorlice-Tarnow Offensive. By the end of the month, his forces neared Przemyśl, which had been captured by the Russians from Austria-Hungary on 22 March 1915. KMK Battery 6 took part in the bombardment of forts X, Xa, XI and XIa, opened on 30 March. Two days later, the Germans took and held forts X, Xa and XI against counter-attack, compelling the Russians to abandon Przemyśl. German troops entered the city on 3 June, then took the remaining forts two days later. From 8 August, KMK Battery 6 supported the XXXX Reserve Corps in its attack on Kaunas Fortress by bombarding Kaunas's three westernmost forts. Although the German siege artillery's shelling of Kaunas was slow, the fortifications were outdated and were easily destroyed. The city fell on 18 August.

To the south, KMK Batteries 3 and 5 participated in the siege of Novogeorgievsk, which the Germans had surrounded on 10 August. On 13 August, KMK Batteries 3 and 5 attacked with the siege guns from the north, shelling forts XIV, XV and XVI. On 16 August, German infantry stormed forts XV and XVI as the artillery bombarded them. A 42-centimetre shell struck German troops attacking Fort XV, resulting in heavy casualties but the Germans took the forts. The Russians abandoned the outer ring on 18 August, allowing the Germans to open a hole in the inner ring and capture Novogeorgievsk the next day. The Russians abandoned fortresses wholesale during the Great Retreat. At Grodno, KMK Batteries 3, 5, and 6 were not even fully emplaced when the fortress was evacuated on 3 September. The last deployment of M-Gerät guns on the Eastern Front was in October 1915, when KMK Battery 6 was attached to the German 11th Army as it invaded Serbia.

Replicas and legacy 
The nickname "Big Bertha" appeared early in the war, when German soldiers named the guns  at the Battle of Liège, a reference to Bertha Krupp, who had inherited the Krupp works from her father. The name spread to German newspapers and then to Allied troops as "Big Bertha" and became slang for all heavy German artillery, but especially the 42-centimetre guns. The name has since entered the public consciousness, for example being applied as a moniker to a line of Callaway golf clubs and a satirical French-language magazine and a bond-buying policy by Mario Draghi, President of the European Central Bank.

Two M-Gerät guns were surrendered to the US Army at Spincourt in November 1918. One was taken to the United States, evaluated and then put on display at the Aberdeen Proving Ground, while the other was left unassembled in its transport configuration. Both were scrapped in 1943 and the early 1950s. World War I veteran Emil Cherubin built a replica of an M-Gerät, which toured Germany and appeared on a few postage stamps. The Paris Gun, a railway gun developed during the war and used to bomb Paris in 1918, has historically been confused with the M-Gerät since World War I.

See also 
 List of the largest cannon by caliber
 German WW II Karl-Gerät SP mortar

Notes

Citations

References

Further reading

 Herbert Jäger: German Artillery of World War One, The Crowood Press, 
 Willy Ley: German Siege Guns of the Two World Wars. Journal of Coastal Artillery, February 1943
 Raimund Lorenz: Die "Dicke Berta" aus Vluynbusch, Museumverein Neukirchen-Vluyn
 Rudolf Lusar: Riesengeschütze und schwere Brummer einst und jetzt, J. F. Lehmanns Verlag München, 
 Konrad F. Schreier, Jr.: The World War I "Brummer" in 'Museum Ordnance: The Magazine for the U.S. Army Ordnance Museum', November 1992
 Gerhard Taube: Die schwersten Steilfeuer-Geschütze 1914–1945. Geheimwaffen "Dicke Berta" und "Karl", Motorbuch-Verlag

External links 

 

420 mm artillery
Siege artillery
World War I artillery of Germany
World War I howitzers